Love Me Again is a 1978 album by Rita Coolidge and was released on the A&M Records label. "You" was released as the first single. It was previously recorded by Australian recording artist Marcia Hines. Coolidge's version, in contrast to Hines', is more mellow in tone and it became a Top 40 hit in both the United States and Canada during the summer of 1978. Despite the song having previously hit in Australia, Coolidge's version did not chart there. The title track "Love Me Again" was released as a single and then covered and appeared as a single for Patti Austin in 1980.

Track listing

Side one
 "You" (Tom Snow) – 3:14
 "Slow Dancer" (Boz Scaggs, George Daly) – 4:01
 "Sweet Inspiration" (Dan Penn, Spooner Oldham) – 2:59
 "Love Me Again" (David Lasley, Allee Willis) – 3:38
 "It Just Keeps You Dancing" (Booker T. Jones, Donna Weiss) – 3:04

Side two
 "Bye Bye, Love" (Felice Bryant, Boudleaux Bryant) – 2:58
 "The Jealous Kind" (Robert Charles Guidry) – 4:19
 "Hello Love, Goodbye" (Johnny Rodriguez) – 3:45
 "You're So Fine" (Lance Finnie, William Schofield) – 3:02
 "Songbird" (Christine McVie) – 2:57

Personnel
Rita Coolidge - vocals
Jay Graydon - lead guitar, acoustic guitar
Jerry McGee - electric guitar
Stephen Bruton - acoustic guitar
Dennis Belfield - bass
Booker T. Jones - electric piano, organ, string arrangements
Michael Utley - electric piano, synthesizer
Mike Baird, Sammy Creason - drums
Steve Forman - percussion
Julia Tillman Waters, Luther Waters, Maxine Willard Waters, Oren Waters, Jim Haas, Cory Wells, Larry Lee - backing vocals
Jules Chaikin - conductor
Technical
Jim Isaacson, Kent Nebergall - engineer
Annie Leibovitz - photography

Charts

Certifications and sales

References

Rita Coolidge albums
1978 albums
Albums produced by David Anderle
Albums produced by Booker T. Jones
A&M Records albums
Albums recorded at Sunset Sound Recorders